The Great Blue Heron Casino is located on Scugog Island, just east of the community of Port Perry, Ontario, and northeast of Toronto. Both the Casino and the land on which it is built are owned by the Mississaugas of Scugog Island First Nation. The First Nation theme is carried throughout the facility, in the interior art and is especially noticeable in the signature red, blue and cream colour roof. 

The Great Blue Heron Gaming Company, a partnership of Casinos Austria, the Steiner Family, and Sonco Gaming, operates the Casino. The Ontario Lottery and Gaming Corporation manages the slots, while the Baagwating Community Association, a non-profit, charitable organization formed by the Mississaugas of Scugog Island First Nation, manages the table games. Revenues and profits are distributed among the parties, and to various charitable organizations, based upon contractual sharing arrangements.

Opened originally in 1997, with gaming tables and a 650-seat bingo hall, the Casino was extensively renovated in 1999 and 2000. The table games include: Roulette, Blackjack, Spanish 21, Mini Baccarat, Let it Ride Poker, Texas Hold Em Poker, Pai Gow Poker, Three & Four Card Poker and Texas Hold Em Bonus Poker. As of 1999, there is no longer a bingo hall on premises.

On November 1st 2021 The Great Blue Heron Casino announced the completion of their renovation and hotel, which was announced on January 9 2018. The renovation was delayed multiple times due to the ongoing COVID-19 pandemic. The renovation consists of a 100 room hotel and a 20,000 foot addition to the casino.

See also
 List of casinos in Canada

External links

Great Blue Heron Charity Casino
Casinos Austria
Sonco Inc.
OLG document

References

1997 establishments in Ontario
Mississaugas
Buildings and structures in the Regional Municipality of Durham
Tourist attractions in the Regional Municipality of Durham
Casinos in Ontario
Casinos completed in 1997